is an international airport located  south-southeast of Chitose and Tomakomai, Hokkaidō, Japan, serving the Sapporo metropolitan area. By both traffic and land area, it is the largest airport in Hokkaidō.

It is adjacent to Chitose Air Base, a Japan Air Self-Defense Force base which houses F-15 Eagle fighter jets, the Japanese Air Force One government aircraft and a number of smaller emergency response aircraft and helicopters.  Chitose and New Chitose have separate runways but are interconnected by taxiways, and aircraft at either facility can enter the other by ground if permitted; the runways at Chitose are occasionally used to relieve runway closures at New Chitose due to winter weather. JASDF provides air traffic control for both facilities.

As of 2018, New Chitose Airport was the fifth-busiest airport in Japan, and ranked 64th in the world in terms of passengers carried. The  Sapporo–Tokyo Haneda route is the second busiest air route in the world, with 9.7 million passengers carried in 2018.

History
New Chitose opened in July 1988 to replace the adjacent Chitose Airport, a joint-use facility which had served passenger flights since 1963. The airport's IATA airport code was originally SPK. This code was later adopted as a city code to refer to both New Chitose and the smaller Okadama Airport in central Sapporo, which handles commuter flights within Hokkaido.

New Chitose became Japan's first 24-hour airport in 1994. Services between 10 PM and 7 AM are currently limited to six flights per day due to noise alleviation concerns. Four of these slots are currently used by passenger flights to Tokyo while the other two are used by cargo flights.

New Chitose previously had long-haul service to Amsterdam (KLM, 1997–2002), Cairns (Qantas, 1992–1998 and 2004–2007) and Honolulu (JALWays, 1992–2003, Hawaiian Airlines since 2012). Service to Europe resumed when Finnair launched a new weekly flight to Helsinki from 15 December 2019. Finnair was the unique company to provide direct and scheduled flights between Sapporo and Europe. International services are mainly for transporting tourists from the rest of Asia and for sightseeing and skiing. The area surrounding gates 0 through 2, on the north end of the main terminal, was a sterile area for international flights until the international terminal opened for service on March 26, 2010.

The airport was upgraded with additional private aircraft handling facilities for the 34th G8 summit, held in Hokkaido in 2008.

Due to the airport's sharing of air traffic control with Chitose Air Base, daytime civil operations are limited to 32 takeoffs and landings per hour, and operations by certain foreign aircraft (including Chinese and Russian aircraft) are prohibited on Mondays and Thursdays. These restrictions were scheduled to be eased in March 2017. A second terminal is being built roughly doubling the existing terminal and capacity, scheduled to be complete by August 2019.

Statistics

Airlines and destinations

The airport has a semicircular domestic terminal (reminiscent of the semicircular terminals at DFW Airport) with eighteen gates, and a smaller international terminal with six gates.
Operating hours for international flights at CTS are restricted by the Japanese government in order to avoid interference with JASDF operations at the adjacent air base. As of April 2012, international flights are permitted on Tuesdays and Wednesdays from noon to 4 pm, and from 5 pm on Friday through 11:59 pm on Sunday.

Passenger

Cargo

Other facilities
The domestic terminal contains a 188-room hotel, the Air Terminal Hotel

China Airlines operates its Sapporo office on the third floor of the airport building.

The airline Hokkaido Air System was at one time headquartered in the New Chitose airport terminal. Now its head office is on the property of Okadama Airport in Higashi-ku, Sapporo.

Ground transportation

Rail

New Chitose Airport Station is located on a spur off the Chitose Line of Hokkaido Railway Company (JR Hokkaido). Rapid service trains operate to and from Sapporo Station, taking 36–39 minutes and costing ¥1,070.

Bus
Hokkaidō Chūō Bus/Hokuto Kotsu joint service (Sapporo 4 trips/h, Oyachi 4 trips/h)
Hokkaidō Chūō Bus (Asabu 1–2 trips/h, Miyanosawa 1–2 trips/h)
Hokuto Kotsu (Apa Hotel & Resort 2 trips/h, Maruyama Park hourly)
Donan Bus (Tomakomai 1–2 trips/h, Noboribetsu 3 trips/day, Muroran 12 trips/day, Hobetsu 2 trips/day, Urakawa 2 trips/day)
Atsuma Bus (Atsuma 3 trips/day)

Accidents and incidents

 On August 5, 2011, Philippine Airlines flight 102, a Boeing 747 was several hours into its Manila to Los Angeles flight, when it made an emergency landing at Sapporo-Chitose after there were reports of smoke in the cabin. The flight landed safely and none of the 449 passengers and crew were injured.
 On February 23, 2016, Japan Airlines Flight 3512, a Boeing 737 about to depart Chitose for Fukuoka Airport, was evacuated in the midst of a snowstorm due to smoke in the cabin caused by an engine problem. Three passengers were injured in the evacuation.

References

External links

 

Airports in Hokkaido
Airports established in 1988
1988 establishments in Japan
Japan Air Self-Defense Force bases
Chitose, Hokkaido
Tomakomai, Hokkaido